Theodore Fink (3 July 1855 – 25 April 1942) was an Australian politician, newspaper proprietor and educationist.

Early life
Fink was born in Guernsey on the Channel Islands, the son of Moses Fink, a shopkeeper, and his wife Gertrude, née Ascher.
 Brought to Victoria, Australia by his father in 1860, he was educated at the Flinders School, Geelong, at Geelong College, and at Melbourne Church of England Grammar School from 1871, where Alfred Deakin was a classmate and friend. Fink qualified as a solicitor at the University of Melbourne and established a successful practice.

Political career
In September 1894 Fink was elected to the Victorian Legislative Assembly as member for Jolimont and West Richmond, holding the seat for 10 years. On 5 December 1899 he became a minister without portfolio in the Allan McLean ministry. The treasurer William Shiels had been in bad health and the intention was that Fink should act as an assistant to him. He, however, objected to some personal remarks made by Shiels at a public meeting referring to the ministry just displaced, and resigned from the ministry. It was generally felt that his reasons were insufficient, and his action did harm to his future career as a politician. He supported the federation movement and stood for Kooyong in the House of Representatives at the first federal election in March 1901, but was defeated by William Knox. He still held his seat in the Victorian assembly but retired in 1904 and never afterwards entered politics.

Educationist
During his political career, Fink had been doing valuable work in another direction. He was president of the royal commission on technical education in 1899-1901 which resulted in reforms in primary and technical schools, and he was also president of the royal commission on the University of Melbourne in 1902-4. In August 1904 he was thanked by parliament for his services to education. Subsequently, he was chairman of conferences on apprenticeship in 1906-7 and 1911, chairman of a board of inquiry into the working-men's college in 1910, vice-president of the council of public education, vice-chairman of the state war council of Victoria, and chairman of the Commonwealth repatriation board for Victoria in 1917-19.

Newspaper director
In his younger days Fink had done some writing for the press and in 1889 he became a director of the Herald and Sportsman Newspapers Co. Ltd, after being in some financial difficulty after the land boom collapse. A few years later he became chairman of directors. It was generally believed that Fink was an important factor in the great improvement that took place in the conduct of The Herald, and that he was largely responsible for the appointment of such excellent editors as Guy Innes and Sir Keith Murdoch. Fink later resisted Murdoch's attempts to be made a director. He retained his interest in the press until the end of his long life. He died in his Toorak (a Melbourne suburb) home on 25 April 1942. He married in 1881 Kate, daughter of George Isaacs, who predeceased him; he was survived by two sons and two daughters.

Other interests
Fink was much interested in the arts and literature and was widely read. In his earlier days he was well known as an excellent after-dinner speaker, and his witty speeches at social gatherings of artists and literary men were much appreciated. Though he was also well known in the business life of Melbourne as a lawyer and a power in the newspaper world, comparatively few people realized the full value of his educational work. The advance in education in Victoria during the first quarter of the twentieth century was based on the report of the commissions over which he presided, and his recognition of the ability of Frank Tate led to his appointment as director of education and the great expansion which followed.
Fink was a member of the Eclectic Association, fellow members included Arthur Patchett Martin, Arthur Topp, Alfred Deakin and David Mickle.

Fink was President of the Victorian Football Association. In 1896/97 when the eight strongest teams left the VFA to form the Victorian Football League, Fink's wise leadership ensured that the VFA continued to retain an important presence in Victorian sporting circles.

References

Further reading

1855 births
1942 deaths
Victoria (Australia) state politicians
Australian educational theorists
Australian federationists
Guernsey emigrants to Australia
VFA/VFL administrators
British emigrants to colonial Australia
19th-century Australian politicians
People educated at Melbourne Grammar School
Australian solicitors
20th-century Australian politicians
People educated at Geelong College